Gioè is a surname. Notable people with the surname include:

Bryan Gioè (born 1993), Italian footballer
Charles Gioe (1904-1954), lieutenant in the Chicago Outfit
Claudio Gioè (born 1975), Italian actor